, also written 2017 XO2, is a sub-kilometer asteroid and near-Earth object of the Apollo group approximately  in diameter. On 26 April 2057, it will pass Earth at a similar distance of 21 LD again.

Discovery and observations 

On 20 January 2018 with a 40-day observation arc, it reached Torino scale 1 with an estimated 1 in 3000 chance of impacting Earth on 28 April 2057. A Monte Carlo simulation using Solex 12 with 1000 clones of the asteroid generated one impactor.

These precovery images extended the observation arc from 40 days to 6.21 years.

The asteroid was last observed on 20 January 2018 at apparent magnitude 24 by T14 Mauna Kea. As the asteroid is becoming very faint, further observations during this approach are difficult.

Orbit and classification 

 is an Apollo asteroid, the largest group of near-Earth objects and Earth-crossing asteroids with approximately 10 thousand known members. It orbits the Sun at a distance of 0.72–1.55 AU once every 15 months (440 days; semi-major axis of 1.13 AU). Its orbit has an eccentricity of 0.36 and an inclination of 15° with respect to the ecliptic.

Physical characteristics 

Based on a generic magnitude-to-diameter conversion,  measures between 100 and 200 meters in diameter, for an absolute magnitude of 22.4, and an assumed albedo between 0.05 and 0.20, which represent typical values for carbonaceous and stony asteroids, respectively. As of 2018, no rotational lightcurve of this object has been obtained from photometric observations. The body's rotation period, pole and shape remain unknown.

Numbering and naming 

This minor planet has neither been numbered nor named.

References

External links 
 List Of Apollo Minor Planets (by designation), Minor Planet Center
 
 

Minor planet object articles (unnumbered)

20171106
20171210